Cyclozodion is a genus of crabs in the family Calappidae, containing the following species:
 Cyclozodion angustum (A. Milne-Edwards, 1880)
 Cyclozodion tuberatum Williams & Child, 1989

References

External links

Calappoidea